Mārtiņš Sirmais (born July 15, 1982 in Madona) is a Latvian orienteering competitor. He received a silver medal in the middle distance at the 2006 European Orienteering Championships in Otepää, and again at the 2008 European Orienteering Championships in Ventspils.

References

External links

1982 births
Living people
People from Madona
Latvian orienteers
Male orienteers
Foot orienteers
Competitors at the 2009 World Games
Competitors at the 2005 World Games